The Triumph Fury was a two-door convertible prototype by the Standard-Triumph Company of Coventry. It was the first monocoque sports car to be made by Triumph. Body design was by the Italian stylist Giovanni Michelotti and the car used components from the 2000 saloon including the 2.0L 6-cylinder engine of the time, although the use of the 2.5L 6-cylinder or the 3.0L Triumph V8 was possibly intended, had the car gone into production.  The car lost out to the continuation of the separate-chassis TR series, with the Triumph TR5 being introduced in August 1967. The decision by Triumph to not develop the car was due in part to the reluctance to invest in new production line and tooling facilities required to manufacture the model, in favour of continuing with the simpler manufacturing of the separate body and chassis design of the TR series.

The prototype still exists and is owned by a classic car rental business.

References

Further reading 
 Triumph Fury Pictures at http://www.furyworld.fsnet.co.uk/Triumph.html

Fury
Rear-wheel-drive vehicles
Cars introduced in 1964